North Branch is a hamlet in the town of Callicoon, Sullivan County, New York, United States. It is on the north branch of the Callicoon Creek. North Branch has a post office with ZIP code 12766. It was once famous for its local cider mill, the North Branch Cider Mill.

References

Hamlets in Sullivan County, New York
Hamlets in New York (state)